A constitutional referendum was held in Haiti on 10 and 11 January 1928. Voters were asked to approve or reject thirteen amendments to the constitution. Each amendment was voted on separately, with all approved by at least 97% of voters.

Background
The thirteen proposed amendments were:

Results

References

1928 in Haiti
1928 referendums
Initiatives and referendums in Haiti
Constitutional referendums in Haiti
January 1928 events